W. Allyn Rickett (October 26, 1921 – April 18, 2020) was an American historian, and a professor emeritus of Chinese and Asian and Middle Eastern studies at the University of Pennsylvania. He was also a published author.

Rickett was an intelligence officer of the Office of Naval Intelligence at the end of World War II. Later, from 1948 he and his wife, Adele studied and gathered intelligence in Beijing until they were arrested by the Communists. They spent four years in prison in China and later published a book about their experiences under the title Prisoners of Liberation in 1957. The book was translated into many languages and republished several times during the years. 

He translated various Chinese classics including the Guanzi.

Rickett died April 18, 2020, aged 98.

References

1921 births
2020 deaths
University of Pennsylvania faculty
21st-century American historians
21st-century American male writers
American spies
American sinologists
American male non-fiction writers
United States Navy personnel of World War II